Jama Boss (born 3 May 1994) is a Somali footballer who plays as a forward for Australian club St Albans Saints and the Somalia national team.

Club career
Born in Somalia, Boss moved to Yemen with his family when he was three-months-old. At the age of 12, following the death of his father, Boss moved to Hamilton, New Zealand in order to be closer to his relatives. 

In December 2013, Boss joined Waikato, signing for Hamilton Wanderers in 2015. In 2017, Boss signed for Melville United. After three seasons with Melville, Boss joined Tasman United. At Tasman, Boss scored one league goal in eight appearances, rejoining Hamilton Wanderers in 2020. After a short five game stint with Hamilton, Boss signed for Manukau United later that year. In 2021, Melville re-signed Boss. During the 2021 New Zealand National League season, Boss scored five goals in eight games for Melville. In 2021, Boss moved to Australia, signing for St Albans Saints.

International career
On 27 March 2022, Boss made his debut for Somalia in a 2–1 loss against Eswatini in the qualification for the 2023 Africa Cup of Nations.

References

1994 births
Living people
Association football forwards
Somalian footballers
Somalia international footballers
Somalian expatriate footballers
Hamilton Wanderers players
Tasman United players
St Albans Saints SC players
New Zealand National League players
National Premier Leagues players